Monk in France is an album by jazz pianist Thelonious Monk, originally recorded on April 18, 1961. The remastered album includes two bonus tracks, "Body and Soul" and "Crepuscule with Nellie."

Track listing 
All songs by Thelonious Monk unless otherwise noted

Side One
 "Well You Needn't" – 11:30
 "Off Minor" – 11:41
 "Just A Gigolo" (Irving Caesar, Leonello Casucci, Julius Brammer) – 1:42
Side Two
 "I Mean You" (Monk, Coleman Hawkins) – 11:02
 "Hackensack" – 9:46
 "I'm Getting Sentimental Over You" (Ned Washington, George Bassman) – 8:30

1995 reissue bonus tracks
 "Body and Soul" (Edward Heyman, Robert Sour, Frank Eyton, Johnny Green) – 2:48
 "Crepuscule with Nellie" - 2:39

Personnel 
 Thelonious Monk – piano
 John Ore - bass
 Charlie Rouse - Tenor Saxophone
 Frankie Dunlop - Drums

References 

1961 albums
Thelonious Monk albums
Albums produced by Orrin Keepnews
Riverside Records albums